VA Medical Center station is a DART Light Rail station in Dallas, Texas. It is located at Lancaster Road (SH 342) and Mentor Avenue in the Oak Cliff neighborhood. It opened on May 31, 1997.

References

External links 
 DART - VA Medical Center Station

Dallas Area Rapid Transit light rail stations in Dallas
Railway stations in the United States opened in 1997
1997 establishments in Texas
Railway stations in Dallas County, Texas